Mohammad Bohrani  (born September 11, 1981) is an Iranian voice actor, puppeteer, actor, director, presenter, and poet. Best known for his voice acting improvisations as one of the most popular adult puppets in the history of the Iranian television Jenab Khan (roughly translated= Mr. Mr); who is originally from southern Iran, speaks Persian with the heavy regional accent, and performs rhythmic songs with typical southern Iranian tone.  Due to his profound sense of humor, he gradually became the critical voice of the people in contrast to power.
Bohrani is also known for voice acting as two characters, Aghoye Hamsadeh (Mr. neighbor) and Baabaee, in an Iranian famous children's television program Kolah Ghermezi.

Biography and career
Mohammad Bohrani (September 11, 1981, Shiraz, Iran) was born to an English teacher father and a housewife mother. He is the last of their four children; 3 sons and a daughter.

Despite receiving a math and physics diploma, he completed his education with a Bachelor of Arts degree in 2005 from the college of art at the University of Tehran. He entered Tarbiat Modares University, where he completed his Master of Arts degree in 2008. He married one of his classmates and coworker Mahnaz Khatibi in 2006.

He started his career with college theater and puppetry. In one of his performances in a festival, Maryam Sadat (a member of the jury) invited him to take part in Ninimoun (Our Baby), a live television program directed by Bahram ShahMohammadlou.

Since entering the television programs in 2001, Bohrani has participated in numerous puppet projects for children and adults. The Iranian well-known puppet Jenab Khan introduced to television for the first time from a home video series called Morvarid alley. Rambod Javan, a co-star in Morvarid alley, invited Jenab Khan to his variety show Khandevaneh.

Characterization of Jenab Khan is a product of Bohrani's lived experience; from his childhood in Shiraz with Khouzestan war refugee children to his college dorm experiences. Most of the Jenab Khan dialogues are Bahrani's improvisations.
Bohrani is also well known for voice acting as two characters, Aghoye Hamsadeh (Mr. neighbor) and Baabaee, in an Iranian popular children TV series, Kolah Ghermezi, created by Hamid Jebeli and Iraj Tahmasb. 
He performed as a voice actor in many children TV series such as Ostad-e Hamechidoon (all-knowing Professor), Shahr-e Koudakan (city of children), and Ba ma Kash Bashi (Wish you would be with us).

In addition to voice acting, he, along with Amir Soltan Ahmadi, wrote and performed the music video World Cup in 2014. They once again produced another music video for the 2018 world cup called We are coming to Russia. In this music video, they feature Jenab Khan as the guest-star singer.
As an actor, Bahrani appeared in several movies and TV series such as Sly, Tabagheye Haasas, Monster, Golshifteh, and Doping. One of the main parts of his versatile body of works consists of theatre acting and directing.

Work

Acting

Movies

TV Series and Home Network Entertainment

Theatre

Directing

Voice acting and puppeteering in theatre

Voice acting and puppeteering in TV

Narrating and presenting

Singing

Lyrics and poetry

Awards and nominations

See also

References

External links
 
 
 محمد بحرانی ویکی‌پدیا
 Interview with Mohammad Bahrani, Dorehami, Season5, TV Nasim, March 23, 2020
 Mohammad Bahrani Irantheater
 Mohammad Bahrani salamcinama
 مصاحبهٔ خبر آنلاین با محمد بحرانی

1981 births
Living people
21st-century Iranian male actors
Tarbiat Modares University alumni
Iranian film directors
Iranian male film actors
Iranian male stage actors
Iranian male voice actors
Iranian puppeteers
Iranian comedians
Iranian male television actors
University of Tehran alumni
People from Shiraz